Kanash (Kanaş, lit. soviet) is a town in the Chuvash Republic, Russia, located at a major railway junction  from Cheboksary, the capital of the republic. Population:

History
It was founded in 1891. Between 1891 and 1925 it was called Shikhrany.

The town's history is closely linked to the development of the railway. The Moscow–Kazan line was completed, except for the Imperatorsky Romanovsky railway bridge across Volga, in December 1884 by private Moscow Ryazan Railway Company which was renamed to Moscow Kazan Railway Company on July 11, 1891, which provided all train service in the area up to 1918, when all the remaining private railways were nationalized by the Bolsheviks.

The opening of the station, which was then surrounded by woodland, provided a convenient production point for the timber industry, and windmills were built in the area. In 1911, there were more than forty trading firms in Shikhrany. In 1912, a primary school was opened, and in 1914—a middle school. In 1919, Shikhrany station became a railway junction, when the Arzamas–Shikhrany line, which had been under construction from 1914, when the last section was completed from the Tsarkli River bridge to Shihrany, and opened to full traffic. The line had been in restricted use with limited car loads since summer 1917.

By 1925, when Kanash was granted town status, its population was approximately 2,200.

Another station was built in 1926 for goods transit. The first power station, which supplied electricity to the railway station, portions of the town, and thirteen nearby villages, was constructed in 1929.

Construction of the Kanash–Cheboksary line began in 1939, bringing the number of lines connecting Kanash up to four.

During World War II, railway production facilities and transit capacity were substantially increased.

From the 1950s to the 1970s, local industry was diversified. Factories producing furniture, tools, polymers, and plastics, and car repair factories were built.

Administrative and municipal status
Within the framework of administrative divisions, Kanash serves as the administrative center of Kanashsky District, even though it is not a part of it. As an administrative division, it is incorporated separately as the town of republic significance of Kanash—an administrative unit with the status equal to that of the districts. As a municipal division, the town of republic significance of Kanash is incorporated as Kanash Urban Okrug.

Notable residents 

Alexandra Boltasseva (born 1978), professor of electrical and computer engineering 
Nadezhda Wijenberg (born 1964), long-distance runner

References

Notes

Sources

External links

Official website of Kanash 
Kanash Business Directory  

Cities and towns in Chuvashia
Monotowns in Russia